Evelyn Sneddon Morrison (1 August 1902 – 15 November 1968) was a Scottish footballer who played as a centre forward. His most notable spell was with Falkirk, where he finished as the top scorer in Scottish Football League Division One in the 1928–29 season, scoring 47 goals. This remains the highest single-season total ever recorded for the club.

He also played for Stenhousemuir (where he made his senior debut in 1927 aged 26), Sunderland and Partick Thistle, where it appears his short period as a professional concluded in 1932 despite maintaining a strong rate of goalscoring.

Morrison was born in South Africa to Scottish parents; the family returned to their native Lanarkshire while he was a young boy. After his football career ended he became a school teacher in Blantyre.
In 1939 he married Lily Ann Stewart Ashenhurst (1904–1960)

References

1902 births
1968 deaths
Scottish footballers
South African soccer players
Falkirk F.C. players
Sunderland A.F.C. players
Scottish Football League players
English Football League players
South African emigrants to the United Kingdom
Footballers from Hamilton, South Lanarkshire
People educated at Hamilton Academy
Scottish league football top scorers
Association football forwards